In enzymology, an UDP-N-acetylglucosamine diphosphorylase is an enzyme that catalyzes the chemical reaction

UTP + N-acetyl-alpha-D-glucosamine 1-phosphate  diphosphate + UDP-N-acetyl-D-glucosamine

Thus, the two substrates of this enzyme are UTP and[N-acetyl-alpha-D-glucosamine 1-phosphate, whereas its two products are diphosphate and UDP-N-acetyl-D-glucosamine.  This enzyme participates in aminosugars metabolism.

Nomenclature 

This enzyme belongs to the family of transferases, specifically those transferring phosphorus-containing nucleotide groups (nucleotidyltransferases).  The systematic name of this enzyme class is UTP:N-acetyl-alpha-D-glucosamine-1-phosphate uridylyltransferase. Other names in common use include UDP-N-acetylglucosamine pyrophosphorylase, uridine diphosphoacetylglucosamine pyrophosphorylase, UTP:2-acetamido-2-deoxy-alpha-D-glucose-1-phosphate, uridylyltransferase, UDP-GlcNAc pyrophosphorylase, GlmU uridylyltransferase, Acetylglucosamine 1-phosphate uridylyltransferase, UDP-acetylglucosamine pyrophosphorylase, uridine diphosphate-N-acetylglucosamine pyrophosphorylase, uridine diphosphoacetylglucosamine phosphorylase, and acetylglucosamine 1-phosphate uridylyltransferase.

References 

 
 

EC 2.7.7
Enzymes of known structure